Chinese dress may refer to:

Hanfu, the historical clothing of the Han Chinese people
Cheongsam, also known as Qipao, a body-hugging one-piece dress for women
Changpao, a body-hugging one-piece dress for men

See also
Chinese clothing